MKS FunFloor Lublin is a women's handball club from Lublin, Poland, that plays in the Superliga.

Kits

European record

Team

Current squad
Squad for the 2022–23 season

Goalkeepers
 12  Weronika Gawlik
 26  Paulina Wdowiak
 69  Karolina Sarnecka
Left wingers
 3  Oktawia Płomińska
 23  Julia Pietras
Right wingers
 21  Daria Szynkaruk
 95  Katarzyna Portasińska
Line players
6  Joanna Andruszak
 22  Andrijana Tatar
 66  Patrycja Noga
 77  Maria Szczepaniak

Left backs
 8  Dominika Więckowska
 10  Marianna Rebičová
Centre backs
 10  Romana Roszak
 19  Michalina Pastuszka
 89  Kinga Achruk
Right backs
 17  Magda Wieckowska 
 79  Paulina Masna
 99  Julia Zagrajek

Transfers 
Transfers for the 2022-23 season

 Joining
 
 Leaving

Staff members
Staff for the 2022-23 season.
  Head Coach: Monika Marzec
  Assistant Coach: Piotr Dropek
  Team Leader: Radoslaw Kozaczuk
  Physiotherapist: Beata Gwizdek
  Physiotherapist: Tomasz Pietras
  Physical coach: Paweł Woliński
  Physical coach: Mateusz Nowicki
  Mental coach: Beata Drewienkowska

Notable players 
 
 Jessica Quintino  
 Ivana Božović  
 Valentina Blažević
 Ekaterina Dzhukeva 
 Iwona Niedźwiedź  
 Anna Wysokińska  
 Joanna Drabik   
 Agnieszka Kocela 
 Dagmara Nocuń 
 Kristina Repelewska 
 Małgorzata Stasiak 
 Joanna Szarawaga 
 Alina Wojtas 
 Aleksandra Baranowska

References

External links
 Official website

Polish handball clubs
Sport in Lublin